Munhwa (Hangul: 문화, Hanja: 文化) means culture in Korean.

It may refer to:

 Munhwa Broadcasting Corporation, one of the leading South Korean television and radio networks.
 Munhwa Ilbo, a daily newspaper in South Korea.
 Munhwa Ryu, one of the great aristocratic houses of Goryeo and Joseon dynasty.
 Munhwaŏ (North Korean standard language), the North Korean standard version of the Korean language.